Olivais is a freguesia (civil parish) and district of Lisbon, the capital of Portugal. Located in eastern Lisbon, Olivais is west of Parque das Nações, north of Marvila and Alvalade, and east of Lumiar and Santa Clara. The population in 2011 was 33,788.

History

The parish was created in 1397, probably resulting in the division of a part of Beato (to the south) and Sacavém (to the north).

Between 1852 and 1886 Santa Maria dos Olivais formed a large municipality, predominantly rural, including 22 civil parishes.

In 1864 it occupied a surface of approximately 223 km2 and had a population of 25,495, and of 29,491, in 1878.

With the 2012 administrative reform, the parish name was reduced from Santa Maria dos Olivais to Olivais.

Economy
Companies with head offices in Santa Maria dos Olivais and Portela Airport include TAP Portugal and CTT Correios de Portugal, S.A.

Landmarks
Local landmarks include the Palácio do Contador-Mor, a pedagogic farm, Casa da Fonte do Anjo, Quinta da Bica, Quinta da Fonte do Anjo, Capela da Quinta da Fonte do Anjo.

References

External links

 Santa Maria dos Olivais 

Parishes of Lisbon